The Stuff of Thought: Language As a Window Into Human Nature is a 2007 book by experimental psychologist Steven Pinker. In the book Pinker "analyzes how our words relate to thoughts and to the world around us and reveals what this tells us about ourselves."  Put another way, Pinker "probes the mystery of human nature by examining how we use words". The book became a New York Times best seller.

Summary
Pinker argues that language provides a window into human nature, and that "analyzing language can reveal what people are thinking and feeling." He asserts that language must do two things:

  convey a message to an audience, and 
  negotiate the social relationship between the speaker and the audience.

Therefore, language functions at these two levels at all times.  For example, a common-place statement such as "If you could pass the salt, that would be great" functions both as a request (though formally not a request) and as a means of being polite or non-offensive (through not directing the audience to overt demands).   Pinker says of this example: 

Through this lens, Pinker asks questions such as "What does the peculiar syntax of swearing tell us about ourselves?" Or put another way, "Just what does the 'fuck' in 'fuck you' actually mean?", - as discussed in the chapter The Seven Words You Can't Say on Television.  The arguments contained within ride on the backs of his previous works, which paint human nature as having "distinct and universal properties, some of which are innate – determined at birth by genes rather than shaped primarily by environment."

See also

 Computational theory of mind
 Sociobiology
 Evolutionary psychology
 Imprinting
 Chomsky, Noam
 Hofstadter, Douglas
 Social semiotics
 Kant, Immanuel

References

External links
 Steven Pinker's Harvard Department of Psychology website
 Douglas Hofstadter's review for The Los Angeles Times  
 William Saletan's review for The New York Times Book Review, 
 Seth Lerer's review for The New York Sun, 

2007 non-fiction books
Books about cognition
Linguistics books
Cognitive science literature
Works by Steven Pinker
English-language books